Ghindeni is a commune in Dolj County, Oltenia, Romania with a population of 2,264 people. It is composed of a single village, Ghindeni, part of Malu Mare Commune until 2004, when it was split off.

References

Communes in Dolj County
Localities in Oltenia